William Douglas Roy Currey (born 2 June 1944) is a former New Zealand rugby union player. A wing three-quarter, Currey represented Taranaki at a provincial level, and was a member of the New Zealand national side, the All Blacks, on their 1968 tour of Australia and Fiji. He played seven matches for the All Blacks on that tour, but did not appear in any internationals.

References

1944 births
Living people
Rugby union players from Auckland
People educated at Auckland Grammar School
New Zealand rugby union players
New Zealand international rugby union players
Taranaki rugby union players
Rugby union wings
New Zealand schoolteachers